

National teams

Australia national soccer team

Results and fixtures

Friendlies

Australia women's national soccer team

Results and fixtures

Friendlies

National Soccer League

Championship play-off

References

2002 in Australian sport
2003 in Australian sport
Seasons in Australian soccer